Kiyoshi, (きよし or キヨシ), is a Japanese given name, also spelled Kyoshi.

Possible meanings
Kyōshi, a form of Japanese poetry
Kyōshi, a Japanese honorific

Possible writings
清, "cleanse"
淳, "pure"
潔, "undefiled"
清志, "cleanse, intention"
清司, "cleanse, official"
聖, "holy"
澄, "lucidity"
潔司, "undefiled, official"

People with the name
Akira Kawabata ("Kiyoshi"), pro wrestler
, Japanese sport wrestler
, Japanese pole vaulter
, Japanese film actor
, Japanese baseball player
, Japanese ice hockey player
, Japanese ice hockey player
, Japanese admiral
, Japanese artist
, Japanese Enka singer
, Japanese historian and Shinto priest
, Japanese drummer of Asian Kung-Fu Generation
, a Shiatsu Master, Shiatsupractor (SPR), 
, Japanese academic, historian and writer
, Japanese mathematician
, Japanese general soldier
, Japanese Christian journalist
, Japanese voice actor
, Japanese businessman
, Japanese actor
, Japanese photographer
, Japanese American author and advocate
, Japanese film director
, Japanese golfer
, Japanese philosopher
Kiyoshi K. Muranaga (1922–1944), soldier
, Japanese cyclist
, Japanese sumo wrestler
, Japanese kendoka, iaidoka and aikidoka
Kiyoshi Nakamura (disambiguation), multiple people
, Japanese politician
, Japanese photographer
, Japanese handball player
, Japanese composer
, Japanese handball player
, Japanese navy pilot
, Japanese mathematician
, Japanese murderer
, Japanese former football player
Kiyoshi Saitō (disambiguation), multiple people
, Japanese anime producer and animator
, Japanese film director
, Japanese physician and bacteriologist
, Japanese photographer
, Japanese photographer
, Japanese poet
, Japanese Yakuza
, Japanese professional wrestler
, Japanese boxer
, Japanese Methodist minister
, Japanese footballer
, Japanese baseballer
, Japanese consul
, Japanese politician
, Japanese fencer
Kiyoshi Uematsu (born 1978), Japanese judōka
, Japanese artist
, Japanese kobudōka

Fictional characters
Kiyoshi, from Hanazuki: Full of Treasures
, from Battle Royale II: Requiem
Kiyoshi Tani, from the novel We Are Not Free by Traci Chee
Avatar Kyoshi, a minor character from Avatar: The Last Airbender and The Legend of Korra, in which she is deceased but eventually became the heroine in her own book series

Literature
The Legend of Kyoshi, a fantasy novel duology set in the Avatar franchise
The Rise of Kyoshi, the first book in the series, published on July 16, 2019
The Shadow of Kyoshi, the second book in the series, published on July 21, 2020

See also
 Kyoshi (disambiguation)

Japanese masculine given names